Andrew Doyle may also refer to:

 Andrew Doyle (artist) (1774–1841), Irish painter and engraver
 Andrew Doyle (comedian), British satirist, playwright and journalist
 Andrew Doyle (politician) (born 1960), Irish junior agriculture minister (2016–2020)
 C. Andrew Doyle (born 1966), American Episcopal cleric